Miami (Western Apache: Goshtłʼish Tú) is a town in Gila County, Arizona, United States. Miami is a classic Western copper boom-town. Miami's old downtown has been partly renovated, and the Bullion Plaza Museum features the cultural, mining and ranching history of the Miami area.

According to the 2010 Census, the population of the town was 1,837.

Geography
Miami is located at 33°23.8'N 110°52.3'W (33.396, -110.872).

Miami is adjacent to Globe, and near the San Carlos Apache Indian Reservation. Miami, Globe, and the unincorporated areas nearby (including Inspiration, Claypool and Central Heights-Midland City) are commonly called Globe-Miami.  The town is located on the northeastern slope of the Pinal Mountains, and is surrounded (except to the east) by the Tonto National Forest. It is located on U.S. Route 60 and is served by the Arizona Eastern Railway.

Demographics

As of the census of 2000, there were 1,936 people, 754 households, and 493 families residing in the town. The racial makeup of the town was 74.7% White, 1.0% Black or African American, 1.5% Native American, 0.1% Asian, 20.4% from other races, and 2.3% from two or more races.  54.4% of the population were Hispanic or Latino of any race.

There were 754 households, out of which 31.6% had children under the age of 18 living with them, 42.7% were married couples living together, 16.8% had a female householder with no husband present, and 34.5% were non-families. 31.0% of all households were made up of individuals, and 15.8% had someone living alone who was 65 years of age or older.  The average household size was 2.57 and the average family size was 3.21.

In the town, the age distribution of the population shows 29.7% under the age of 18, 8.3% from 18 to 24, 24.0% from 25 to 44, 20.9% from 45 to 64, and 17.1% who were 65 years of age or older.  The median age was 36 years. For every 100 females, there were 92.1 males.  For every 100 females age 18 and over, there were 93.6 males.

Copper mining accounts for the largest number of jobs in Miami. According to the 2002 annual report of the Arizona State Mine Inspector, Freeport-McMoRan employed nearly 600 at its Miami operations, including 330 at the smelter and 187 at the mine.

The median income for a household in the town was $27,196, and the median income for a family was $30,625. Males had a median income of $28,250 versus $18,026 for females. The per capita income for the town was $13,674.  About 20.5% of families and 23.6% of the population were below the poverty line, including 28.7% of those under age 18 and 19.7% of those age 65 or over.

Mining
The Miami mine is owned and operated by Freeport-McMoRan. Mining began in 1911 as the Inspiration mine, and  the nation's first froth flotation copper concentrator to process sulfide minerals was built and began production in 1915. Inspiration was among the first to employ vat leaching in 1926 and precipitation plants to recover oxide minerals. Copper was mined underground until after World War II, when the first open-pit mining began. The plant's smelter was modernized in 1974 to meet Clean Air Act standards and further modernized and expanded in 1992. The success of a solvent extraction and electrowinning  plant commissioned in 1979 ended vat leaching by the mid-1980s,  and  the concentrator closed in 1986 as well. The copper rod mill was commissioned in 1966.

Copper mining was suspended in September 2015.  Leaching/SX-EW operations will continue but are expected to decline over time.  The Miami smelter and rod plant continue to operate.  In 2016, copper production at Miami amounted to 25 million pounds of copper. In 2017, copper production was 19 million pounds,  and more than 740 people were employed there.

The Pinto Valley mine is also located near Miami.

Transportation
The Town of Miami operates the Cobre Valley Community Transit, which provides local bus service in Miami and Globe.

Greyhound Lines serves Miami on its Phoenix-El Paso via Globe route. The Miami stop serves Globe.

Notable people
 John E. Bacon, state senator in 2nd Arizona State Legislature 
 Romana Acosta Bañuelos – Treasurer of the United States under Richard Nixon
 Joe Castro – jazz pianist
 Jack Elam – actor, partly known for having lazy-eye, who was inducted into the Hall of Great Western Performers
 Brady Ellison – American archery Olympian, winner of individual bronze medal at the 2016 Olympic Games, multiple World Cup Gold medalist
 Matt Pagnozzi – Major League Baseball player for the Cleveland Indians
 Rueben Martinez – activist and MacArthur Fellow
 Felix L. Sparks – American military commander who led the first Allied force to enter Dachau concentration camp and liberate its prisoners, chronicled in the Netflix series The Liberator
 Esteban Edward Torres – ambassador and politician
 Richard F. Pedersen – United States Ambassador to Hungary, President of the American University of Cairo
 Manuel V. Mendoza – World War II Medal Of Honor Recipient, U.S. Army

Climate
Miami has a semi-arid climate (Köppen: BSh).

Gallery

See also
 List of historic properties in Miami, Arizona
 National Register of Historic Places listings in Gila County, Arizona; eight properties listed in Miami, including:
Our Lady of the Blessed Sacrament Church
Miami Community Church

References

External links
 The Globe & Miami Gazette

 Bullion Plaza Cultural Center & Museum
 Miami photos and information at Western Mining History
 Freeport McMoRan Miami Operations

Towns in Gila County, Arizona